Neeyambaspis enigmatica ("Enigmatic shield of Neeyamba Hill") is the lesser known of the two species of pituriaspid agnathans. The species lived in estuaries during the Middle Devonian, in what is now the Georgina Basin of Western Queensland, Australia.

N. enigmatica differed from its relative, Pituriaspis doylei, in that the headshield was triangular, rather than elongated, that the rostrum was much smaller and shorter, and that there was no cavity at the base of the rostrum that suggested the presence of nasal openings.

References 

 Janvier, Philippe. Early Vertebrates Oxford, New York: Oxford University Press, 1998.  
 Long, John A. The Rise of Fishes: 500 Million Years of Evolution Baltimore: The Johns Hopkins University Press, 1996.  

Pituriaspida
Prehistoric jawless fish genera
Fossil taxa described in 1991